Judeo-Yemeni Arabic (also known as Judeo-Yemeni and Yemenite Judeo-Arabic) is a variety of Arabic spoken by Jews living or formerly living in Yemen. The language is quite different from mainstream Yemeni Arabic, and is written in the Hebrew alphabet. The cities of Sana'a, Aden, al-Bayda, and Habban District and the villages in their districts each have (or had) their own dialect.

The vast majority of Yemenite Jews have relocated to Israel and have shifted to Modern Hebrew as their first language. In 1995, Israel was home to 50,000 speakers of Judeo-Yemeni in 1995, while 1,000 remained in Yemen. According to Yemeni rabbi al-Marhabi, most of these have since left for the United States. , fewer than 300 Jews were believed to remain in Yemen.

See also
 Judeo-Arabic languages

References

Further reading
Khan, G. (Ed.). (2013, January 1). Hebrew as a secret Language in Yemenite Judeo-Arabic (EHLL). Retrieved February 13, 2015, from https://www.academia.edu/6421917/Hebrew_as_a_secret_Language_in_Yemenite_Judeo-Arabic_EHLL_
Wexler, P. (n.d.). Jewish Interlinguistics: Facts and Conceptual Framework. Retrieved February 13, 2015, from https://www.jstor.org/stable/414288
Piamenta, Moshe. 1990–1991. A dictionary of post-classical Yemeni Arabic. Leiden: Brill. (Includes bibliographical references (v. 1, p. xv-xxiv)).
Goitein, Shelomo D. 1960. The language of al-gades: The main characteristics of an Arabic dialect spoken in Lower Yemen. Le Muséon 73. 351–394.

External links
YouTube Video of Judeo-Yemeni

Jews and Judaism in Yemen
Judeo-Arabic languages
Mashriqi Arabic
Languages of Israel
Languages of Yemen